Gustav Rau (28 February 1880 - 5 December 1954) was one of the most notable German hippologists of the 20th century, writing under the pseudonym Gustav Kannstadt. He was born in Paris to an army officer from Württemberg and died in Warendorf.

German male writers
German mammalogists
1880 births
1954 deaths
20th-century German zoologists